Elachista nobilella is a moth of the family Elachistidae found in Europe.

Description
Adults are on wing from May to July.

The larvae feed on grasses, including Agrostis, Arrhenatherum, Bromus, Carex, Dactylis, Festuca, Yorkshire fog (Holcus lanatus) and hairy wood-rush (Luzula pilosa). The larvae create a short and relatively broad, flat, whitish mine. Pupation takes place outside the mine.

Distribution
It is found from Scandinavia and Finland to the Iberian Peninsula and Italy and from France to Romania.

References

External links
 Swedish Moths

nobilella
Leaf miners
Moths described in 1839
Moths of Europe
Taxa named by Philipp Christoph Zeller